Paris-Dakar Rally is a racing video game developed by Broadsword Interactive and published by Acclaim Entertainment for Microsoft Windows and PlayStation 2. It is based on the real-life Paris Dakar Rally – one of the world's most difficult and dangerous sporting events. Based on the 2000 running of the rally, the game features ten locations (each containing four stages) beginning in Senegal and ending in Wadi Elrayan, Egypt.

Reception

The PlayStation 2 version received "unfavourable" reviews according to the review aggregation website Metacritic.

It was nominated for GameSpots 2001 "Worst Game" award among console games, which went to Kabuki Warriors.

References

External links
 

2001 video games
Acclaim Entertainment games
Dakar Rally video games
PlayStation 2 games
Rally racing video games
Sports video games set in France
Video games set in Paris
Video games set in Africa
Video games developed in the United Kingdom
Windows games
Multiplayer and single-player video games
Broadsword Interactive games